200 Meters is a 2020 Jordanian-Palestinian adventure drama film written and directed by Ameen Nayfeh in his feature-length debut. The film premiered in the 17th edition of the Giornate degli Autori section at the 77th Venice International Film Festival on 9 September 2020, where it won the BNL People's Choice Audience Award. It was selected as the Jordanian entry for the Best International Feature Film at the 93rd Academy Awards, but it was not nominated. It won the IFFI ICFT UNESCO Gandhi Medal at 51st International Film Festival of India in January 2021.

Plot
The film revolves around a family in the Palestinian city of Tulkarm,  separated by the Israeli wall, and the efforts of the father who tries to visit his son on the other side of the wall.

Production
The film was shot in Tulkarm in the West Bank in 2019.

Release
200 Meters had its world premiere in the 17th edition of the Giornate degli Autori section at the 77th Venice International Film Festival on 9 September 2020. It was screened at the El Gouna Film Festival in October 2020 and at 51st International Film Festival of India under ICFT UNESCO Gandhi Medal in January 2021. It had an international release on 9 June 2021 and a limited release in USA by Film Movement on 18 November 2022. It was released on VOD by Film Movement Video on 6 December 2022.

Reception

Box office
200 Meters grossed $76,670 in France and Italy.

Critical response
The review aggregator website Rotten Tomatoes reported a 90% approval rating, with an average score of 7.5/10, based on 20 reviews.

Accolades

See also
 List of submissions to the 93rd Academy Awards for Best International Feature Film
 List of Jordanian submissions for the Academy Award for Best International Feature Film
 List of Palestinian films

References

External links

2020 films
2020 adventure films
2020 drama films
2020 directorial debut films
2020s Arabic-language films
2020s Hebrew-language films
2020s English-language films
Jordanian drama films
Palestinian drama films